Operation Dawn may refer to:

Operation Dawn (1967), a planned Egyptian offensive against Israel
Operation Dawn (1983) (Operation Dawn 1), an Iranian offensive in the Iran–Iraq War on 10 April 1983
Operation Dawn 2, an Iranian offensive in the Iran–Iraq War on 22 July 1983
Operation Dawn (1997), a Turkish Armed Forces operation in northern Iraq against the Kurdistan Workers Party
Second Battle of Fallujah also known as Operation Al-Fajr (The Dawn) (2004), joint US-Iraqi offensive against the insurgent stronghold of Fallujah during the Iraq War
Operation Dawn (2012), a Turkish Armed Forces operation against the Kurdistan Workers Party
Operation Dawn (2014), the operation by Islamic fundamentalists to seize Tripoli International Airport as part of the 2014 Libyan conflict

See also 
 Operation Breaking Dawn, a 2022 operation by Israel against targets in Gaza